Ampfield is a village and civil parish in the Borough of Test Valley in Hampshire, England, between Romsey, Eastleigh, and Winchester.  It had a population at the 2001 census of 1,474, increasing to 1,583 at the 2011 Census.

Geography
Ampfield lies on sands and clays of Eocene age near the northern edge of the Hampshire Basin. Ampfield Wood on the London Clay to the north of the village is crossed by the Monarch's Way long distance footpath. The parish includes the hamlets of Knapp and Gosport.

Education

State
Primary:
 Ampfield CofE Primary School

Church
The village church is St Mark. Its construction took 3 years, finishing in 1841. It has stained glass windows dating from the 1850s.

Potters Heron Hotel
The Potters Heron Hotel,  renowned for its thatched roof, is situated in Ampfield Village.

Personalities
The author of the Thomas the Tank Engine series of books, Rev. W Awdry, was born in Ampfield Vicarage.

References

External links

Ampfield.org.uk

Test Valley
Villages in Hampshire